(born December 6, 1977) is a Japanese Kabuki, film, television actor and stage producer.  He is the eldest son and successor of the celebrated Ichikawa Danjūrō XII. He is known for being a renowned tachiyaku (actor specializing in male roles), in particular he specializes in aragoto roles (which is a tradition that has existed in his family since 1660 with his ancestor and founder of the Naritaya acting house, Ichikawa Danjūrō I).

Names and lineage
Danjūrō is a member of the acting guild Naritaya, founded by Ichikawa Danjuro I, which dates back to the 17th century. Born into the Ichikawa family, he is the heir to Ichikawa Kabuki. As is the case with the names of all Kabuki actors, his name is a yago, or stage name, that he succeeded from his father in 2004. Prior to this he went by the stage name Ichikawa Shinnosuke VII. His father Ichikawa Danjūrō XII died in 2013; in January 2019, he announced that he would adopt the name of Danjūrō, thus becoming Ichikawa Danjūrō XIII, in May 2020. The name change was postponed when Kabuki shows were cancelled as a result of the COVID-19 pandemic. Danjūrō assumed his current title on 31 October 2022 ahead of performances starting the following week. At the same time his son Kangen Horikoshi took the name Ichikawa Shinnosuke VIII (the first name his father Ebizo used when he started acting in kabuki theater) and made his Kabuki debut.

Career

Early acting career
At a very young age, Danjūrō began rigorous training: voice training to master the unusual vocalizations that characterize Kabuki, and physical training to prepare for the stylized movements and poses demanded on the stage. Ichikawa Ebizō XI appeared on stage for the first time at age five in 1983 at the Kabukiza Theater in the role of “Harumiya” in the performance of The Tale of Genji (Genji Monogatari).  In 1985, he received the stage name Ichikawa Shinnosuke VII, an honorific name in the Ichikawa lineage, and made his full stage debut in the performance of Uiro-uri also at the Kabukiza Theater.  In 1994, he made his first television appearance in the NHK Taiga drama, Hana no Ran, which starred his father Ichikawa Danjuro XII.  And in 2003, he was cast as a leading role Miyamoto Musashi, in the NHK Taiga drama, Musashi.

Later work
In 2011, Ichikawa Ebizō XI landed a starring role in the film Hara-Kiri: Death of a Samurai, which premiered at the 2011 Cannes Film Festival.  The film Ask This of Rikyu in 2013 was a biographical film of Sen no Rikyū in which he won Best Actor at the 37th Japan Academy Film Prize for performing the title role. The following year, he starred in the film Over Your Dead Body, and in 2017 he appeared in a supporting role in the Japanese samurai film Blade of the Immortal, which also premiered at the 2017 Cannes Film Festival. He has appeared numerous times at the Kabuki-za Theater, Osaka Shochikuza Theater, Minami-za Theater, and many other theaters in Japan.

In recent years, Danjūrō has been actively engaged in producing performances to reintroduce the values of traditional Japanese art to the contemporary generation in projects. Since 2012, Danjūrō has produced the performance series entitled “Invitation to the Classics” to make Kabuki more accessible to smaller cities in rural Japan.  Also, in 2013, 2015 and 2017, he self-produced an innovative project called “ABKAI” where the original contemporary Kabuki was introduced. On November 28, 2019, Danjūrō starred as Kairennosuke in the stage production . In addition, his son Kangen Horikoshi portrayed a younger version of Kairennosuke in the play's third act.

On 22 May 2022, Danjūrō conducted a kabuki performance with his "nirami" glare atop the roof of Tokyo Skytree to celebrate the 10th anniversary of the tower's opening.

International performance
His activities have taken him abroad extensively, including performances in Paris in 2004, London/Amsterdam in May–June 2006, Paris Opera in March 2007, Monaco Opera in September 2009, London/Rome in June 2010, Singapore in November 2014 and October 2015, UAE in February 2016.  He has also appeared at Carnegie Hall in New York City in February 2016, which collaborated with Noh and Kyogen.
    
Danjūrō became the first kabuki actor to hold commemorative performances at the Theatre national de Chaillot in Paris, and he earned a nomination for the prestigious Laurence Olivier Award for his work on the London stage in 2006.  In 2007, France awarded him its prestigious The Ordre des Arts et des Lettres in appreciation of his work.

Filmography

Film
Sea Without Exit (2006) – Koji Namiki
Hara-Kiri: Death of a Samurai (2011) – Tsukumo Hanshiro
Ask This of Rikyu (2013) – Sen no Rikyū
Over Your Dead Body (2014) – Kousuke Hasegawa/Tamiya Iemon
Blade of the Immortal (2017) – Eiku Shizuma

Television
NHK Taiga drama
Hana no Ran (1994) – young Ashikaga Yoshimasa
Musashi (2003) – Miyamoto Musashi
Naotora: The Lady Warlord (2017) – Oda Nobunaga
Kirin ga Kuru (2020–21) – Narrator
Toyotomi Hideyoshi (1995, TV Tokyo) – Kipposhi
Ooka Echizen no Kami (1997, TV Tokyo) – Ichijuro Ooka
Chushingura Nakazokyoran (2000, TV Asahi) – Nakazo Nakamura
Mr. Brain (2009, TBS) – Kōhei Takei
Matsumoto Seicho Drama Special Kiri no Hata (2010, Nihon TV) – Kinya Otsuka (leading role)
Story of Machiko Hasegawa (2013, Fuji TV) – Ichikawa Ebizō IX
Yowakutemo Katemasu (2014, NTV) – Kentarō Yachida
Ishikawa Goemon (2016, TV Tokyo) – Ishikawa Goemon
Okehazama (2021, Fuji TV) – Oda Nobunaga

Animation
 Case Closed –  Conan and Ebizō's Kabuki Jūhachiban Mystery, which is the 804th and 805th episodes in honor of 20th anniversary of the Detective Conan anime.

Personal life
On November 19, 2009, he announced his engagement to news presenter Mao Kobayashi.

On November 25, 2010, Danjūrō got involved in a late-night brawl at a members-only bar in the Nishi Azabu district of Tokyo, and sustained serious injuries, including a burst blood vessel in his left eye. Although the assailant, a member of a motorcycle gang, was arrested and jailed, the court's judgment was that Danjūrō's role in provoking the incident could not be denied. The incident caused a subsequent hiatus in his acting activities, and led to the cessation of a commercial advertising campaign featuring him. The incident received broad coverage due to Danjūrō's status, and brought to public view the links that exist between the entertainment world and mobsters in Japan.

On July 25, 2011, his daughter, Reika, was born. On March 22, 2013, his son and successor Kangen Horikoshi (now Ichikawa Shinnosuke VIII) was born. 

In 2016, he ordained as a Shingon Buddhist monk at Narita-san Shinshō-ji temple.

On June 22, 2017, Mao Kobayashi died after a protracted battle with breast cancer.

See also
 Ichikawa Ebizō - chronology of Ebizō kabuki actors
 Ichikawa Danjūrō - chronology of Danjuro kabuki actors

References

External links
 Career Timeline
 NARITAYA Ichikawa Danjuro/Ebizo Official Website
 ABKAI Ichikawa Ebizō XI blog 

1977 births
Living people
Horikoshi High School alumni
Japanese Buddhist clergy
Kabuki actors
People from Tokyo
Male actors from Tokyo
Shingon Buddhist monks
Taiga drama lead actors